Cierpinski is a Polish language habitational surname for someone  from any of various places called Cieszyn. Notable people with the name include:

 Maritta Cierpinski (1950), German middle-distance runner
 Waldemar Cierpinski (1950), former East German athlete

References 

Polish-language surnames
Polish toponymic surnames